Gachara-ye Chahardeh (also Romanized as Gācharā-ye Chahārdeh; also known as Gācharā and Kāchareh) is a village in Chahardeh Rural District, in the Central District of Astaneh-ye Ashrafiyeh County, Gilan Province, Iran. At the 2006 census, its population was 675, in 226 families.

References 

Populated places in Astaneh-ye Ashrafiyeh County